Mimacraea apicalis, the central acraea mimic, is a butterfly in the family Lycaenidae. It is found in Nigeria, Cameroon, Gabon and the Republic of the Congo.

Adult males mimic Bematistes tellus, while females appear to mimic Acraea oberthueri.

Subspecies
 Mimacraea apicalis apicalis (Nigeria, Cameroon)
 Mimacraea apicalis gabonica Libert, 2000 (Gabon, Congo)

References

Butterflies described in 1889
Poritiinae
Butterflies of Africa
Taxa named by Henley Grose-Smith
Taxa named by William Forsell Kirby